Essex North East was a constituency of the European Parliament located in the United Kingdom, electing one Member of the European Parliament by the first-past-the-post electoral system. Created in 1979 for the first elections to the European Parliament, it was abolished in 1994 and succeeded by the constituencies of Essex North and Suffolk South and Essex South.

Boundaries

On its creation in 1979, it consisted of the parliamentary constituencies of Braintree, Colchester, South East Essex, Maldon, Saffron Walden, Southend East and Southend West.

After the 1984 boundary changes based on the new UK parliamentary constituencies created in 1983, it consisted of Braintree, Harwich, North Colchester, Rochford, Saffron Walden, South Colchester and Maldon, Southend East and Southend West. Harwich had previously been part of the Suffolk constituency.

The constituency was abolished in 1994. Braintree, Harwich, North Colchester, Saffron Walden and South Colchester and Maldon became part of Essex North and Suffolk South. Rochford, Southend East and Southend West were now part of the new constituency of Essex South.

MEPs

Election results

References

External links
 David Boothroyd's United Kingdom Election Results 

European Parliament constituencies in England (1979–1999)
Political history of Essex
1979 establishments in England
1994 disestablishments in England
Constituencies established in 1979
Constituencies disestablished in 1994